William Brand may refer to:
William Brand, (1888–1979), Australian politician
William H. Brand, (1824–1891), New York politician
William Brand (botanist), (1807–1869), Scottish botanist